Jesuit Centre for Theological Reflection (JCTR), founded by the Jesuits of the Zambia-Malawi Province in 1988, engages in research, education, and advocacy in Zambia, in the tradition of Catholic Social Teaching (CST).

JCTR aims to influence what government does to enable the people to satisfy their basic human needs now and into the future, and to hold the government morally accountable for its actions. Zambia and Malawi are peaceful countries, rich in natural resources, but in need of vigilance to maintain gains against corrupt practices.

See also
 List of Jesuit sites

References  

Educational organisations based in Zambia
Educational institutions established in 1988
Jesuit development centres
1988 establishments in Zambia